Htilin (also spelt as Htilim or Htilin) is a town in Gangaw District in the Magway Region of Myanmar.  It is the administrative seat for Tilin Township. It is located in western Magway Division contacted with Chin Hills.The people in this township speak Yaw Dialect(Sub-Burmese).

References

External links
 "Tilin Map — Satellite Images of Tilin" Maplandia

Township capitals of Myanmar
Populated places in Magway Region